The term gEDA refers to two things:

 A set of software applications (CAD tools) used for electronic design released under the GPL.  As such, gEDA is an ECAD (electronic CAD) or EDA (electronic design automation) application suite.  gEDA is mostly oriented towards printed circuit board design (as opposed to integrated circuit design). The gEDA applications are often referred to collectively as "the gEDA Suite".
 The collaboration of free software/open-source developers who work to develop and maintain the gEDA toolkit.  The developers communicate via gEDA mailing lists, and have participated in the annual "Google Summer of Code" event as a single project.  This collaboration is often referred to as "the gEDA Project".

The word "gEDA" is a conjunction of "GPL" and "EDA".  The names of some of the individual tools in the gEDA Suite are prefixed with the letter "g" to emphasize that they are released under the GNU General Public License.

History

The gEDA project was started by Ales Hvezda in an effort to remedy the lack of free software EDA tools for Linux/UNIX.  The first software was released on 1 April 1998, and included a schematic capture program and a netlister.  At that time, the gEDA Project website and mailing lists were also set up.

Originally, the project planned to also write a PCB layout program. However, an existing open-source layout program, "PCB", was soon discovered by the project.  Thereafter, the ability to target netlists to PCB was quickly built into the gEDA Project's netlister, and plans to write a new layout program from scratch were scrapped.  Meanwhile, developers working on PCB became affiliates of the gEDA Project.

Other open-source EDA programs were created at about the same time.  The authors of those programs became affiliated with the gEDA website and mailing lists, and the collaborative gEDA Project was born.

At present, the gEDA Project remains a federation of software tools developed by different (but sometimes overlapping) programmers. The thread which holds the project together is the shared vision of creating a powerful, community-based, open-source EDA toolkit.

pcb-rnd was forked from gEDA/PCB in 2013.

Lepton EDA was forked from the gEDA/gaf suite in late 2016.

Detailed description

Loosely speaking, the term "gEDA Suite" refers to all free software projects and applications that have associated themselves with the gEDA Project via the geda-dev/geda-user mailing lists.  These include:

 gEDA/gaf - gschem and friends (the original project)
 PCB - PCB layout program
 Gerbv - Gerber file viewer
 ngspice - a port of Berkeley SPICE
 GnuCap - A modern electronic circuit simulation program
 gspiceui - A GUI front end for ngspice/GnuCap
 gwave - An analog waveform viewer
 gaw - An analog waveform viewer a rewrite of gwave.  Works with gspiceui.
 Icarus Verilog - A Verilog simulator
 GTKWave - A digital waveform viewer
 wcalc - Transmission line and electromagnetic structure analysis

Within the gEDA Suite, gEDA/gaf ("gaf" stands for "gschem and friends") is the smaller subset of tools grouped together under the gEDA name and maintained directly by the gEDA project's founders.  GEDA/gaf includes:

 gschem - A schematic capture program
 gnetlist - A netlist generation program
 gsymcheck - A syntax checker for schematic symbols
 gattrib - A spreadsheet program for editing symbol attributes on a schematic.
 libgeda - Libraries for gschem, gnetlist, and gsymcheck
 gsch2pcb - Forward annotation from schematic to layout using pcb
 Assorted utility programs

Platforms

Linux
Because one of the gEDA Project's longstanding goals is to provide a suite of EDA applications for Linux, all applications in the gEDA Suite compile and run on Linux.  Besides building the programs from source, binary executables for all programs in the gEDA Suite are available from popular package archives; the programs may be installed on many common Linux distributions using package management tools such as apt or dnf.

Unix
All gEDA applications will also compile and run on other Unix-like operating systems, such as OpenBSD, FreeBSD and NetBSD.  Some of these distributions also support installation of pre-packaged binaries using package management utilities.

Mac OS X
Most gEDA applications also install and run successfully on Mac OS X, typically using the Fink package manager and Macports.  Since few commercial EDA tools run on the Mac, this feature has made gEDA a popular electronic design package amongst Mac users.

Microsoft Windows
Microsoft Windows support is currently not a primary project goal.  Nonetheless, some programs in the gEDA Suite have built-in hooks for Windows support, and those programs will build and run under Windows.  However, binary executables for most of the gEDA Suite are not distributed by the gEDA Project.

Community
An important feature of the gEDA project is the strong user community it has created.  The gEDA mailing lists have several hundred subscribers, and many subscribers are electronics experts. Thus, the gEDA mailing lists have become a source not only for information related to the gEDA applications, but also for exchange of general electronic design information.

As a consequence of the project's openness, schematic symbols, footprints, and utility scripts are freely created and shared amongst the members of the gEDA community at a spin-off website, www.gedasymbols.org.

See also

 Comparison of EDA software
 List of free electronics circuit simulators

References

External links
 
 Circuit Design on Your Linux Box Using gEDA — Overview article in the Linux Journal
 gsch2pcb tutorial — How to go from schematic to pcb layout
 Using gEDA — Another tutorial describing how to use the gEDA Toolset.
 Windows installer —  An unofficial installer for windows.

 Lepton EDA —  Fork of gEDA/gaf.

Free electronic design automation software
Electronic design automation software for Linux